Dipak Bahadur K.C. is a Nepalese politician, belonging to the Communist Party of Nepal (Revolutionary Maoist). In the 2008 Constituent Assembly election he was elected from the Pyuthan-2 constituency, winning 12857 votes.

References

Living people
Communist Party of Nepal (Maoist Centre) politicians
Year of birth missing (living people)

Members of the 1st Nepalese Constituent Assembly